Ornduffia calthifolia is a species of plant in the Menyanthaceae family of wetland plants that is endemic to Western Australia.

Description
The species is a marsh inhabitant; it grows as an erect, aquatic or semiaquatic, perennial herb to a height of 0.4–1.2& m. The white flowers appear from September to December.

Distribution and habitat
The species occurs in the Avon Wheatbelt, Jarrah Forest, Swan Coastal Plain and Warren IBRA bioregions of Southwest Australia. It is found in wetlands such as freshwater lakes and swamps.

References

albiflora
Asterales of Australia
Eudicots of Western Australia
Taxa named by Ferdinand von Mueller
Plants described in 1860